The 2016 SangSom Six-red World Championship was a six-red snooker tournament held between 5 and 10 September 2016 at the Bangkok Convention Center in Bangkok, Thailand. It featured 48 players from 16 different nations.

Thepchaiya Un-Nooh was the defending champion, but he lost 2–6 in the last 16 round to Stephen Maguire. Ding Junhui won the title by beating Stuart Bingham 8–7 in the final. Bingham won the first frame of the final, but Ding then built a 3–1 lead. The match then went to 4-4. Ding later led 7-5 but did not pot any balls in the next two frames as Bingham levelled the match at 7-7. In the last frame, Ding made a clearance of 29 to win the match on the final black.

Prize money
The breakdown of prize money for this year is shown below:
 Winner: 2,500,000 baht
 Runner-up: 1,000,000 baht
 Semi-finalists: 500,000 baht
 Quarter-finalists: 250,000 baht
 Last 16: 125,000 baht
 Last 32: 62,500 baht
 Group stage: 31,250 baht
 Total: 8,000,000 baht

Round-robin stage
The top four players from each group qualified for the knock-out stage. All matches were best of 9 frames.

Group A

 Thepchaiya Un-Nooh  5–2  Mohammed Shehab
 Mark Davis  5–0  Ishpreet Singh Chadha
 Rod Lawler  1–5  Lukas Kleckers
 Thepchaiya Un-Nooh  5–3  Lukas Kleckers
 Mark Davis  5–1  Rod Lawler
 Ishpreet Singh Chadha  5–3  Mohammed Shehab
 Thepchaiya Un-Nooh  5–4  Rod Lawler
 Mark Davis  5–4  Mohammed Shehab
 Ishpreet Singh Chadha  5–2  Lukas Kleckers
 Thepchaiya Un-Nooh  1–5  Ishpreet Singh Chadha
 Rod Lawler  4–5  Mohammed Shehab
 Mark Davis  5–2  Lukas Kleckers
 Thepchaiya Un-Nooh  0–5  Mark Davis
 Rod Lawler  5–2  Ishpreet Singh Chadha
 Mohammed Shehab  2–5  Lukas Kleckers

Group B

 Martin Gould  5–0  Basem Eltahhan
 Liang Wenbo  5–0  Chau Hon Man
 Michael Holt  4–5 Sunny  Akani
 Martin Gould  0–5  Sunny Akani
 Liang Wenbo  5–3  Michael Holt
 Chau Hon Man  4–5  Basem Eltahhan
 Martin Gould  5–1  Chau Hon Man
 Michael Holt  5–2  Basem Eltahhan
 Liang Wenbo  3–5  Sunny Akani 
 Chau Hon Man  5–4  Sunny Akani
 Liang Wenbo  5–0  Basem Eltahhan
 Martin Gould  5–4  Michael Holt
 Martin Gould  2–5  Liang Wenbo
 Michael Holt  5–2  Chau Hon Man
 Basem Eltahhan  5–4 Sunny Akani

Group C

 Ding Junhui  4–5  Pankaj Advani
 Robert Milkins  5–4  Ryan Thomerson
 Dominic Dale  3–5  Phaitoon Phonbun
 Robert Milkins  5–1  Phaitoon Phonbun
 Ding Junhui  5–1  Phaitoon Phonbun
 Robert Milkins  3–5  Dominic Dale
 Ryan Thomerson  1–5  Pankaj Advani
 Ding Junhui  3–5  Robert Milkins
 Dominic Dale  5–4  Ryan Thomerson
 Pankaj Advani  5–0  Phaitoon Phonbun
 Ding Junhui  0–5  Dominic Dale
 Robert Milkins  4–5  Pankaj Advani
 Ryan Thomerson  1–5  Phaitoon Phonbun
 Ding Junhui  5–1  Ryan Thomerson
 Dominic Dale  0–5  Pankaj Advani

Group D

 Ricky Walden  5–1  Kritsanut Lertsattayathorn
 David Gilbert  5–2  Ben Woollaston
 Andrew Pagett  3–5  Ahmed Galal
 David Gilbert  5–0  Andrew Pagett
 Ben Woollaston  1–5  Kritsanut Lertsattayathorn
 Ricky Walden 1–5 Andrew Pagett
 Ben Woollaston 5–0 Ahmed Galal
 David Gilbert 3–5 Kritsanut Lertsattayathorn
 Ricky Walden  5–1 Ahmed Galal
 Ricky Walden 5–1 Ben Woollaston
 David Gilbert  5–4 Ahmed Galal
 Andrew Pagett 2–5 Kritsanut Lertsattayathorn
 Ricky Walden 1–5 David Gilbert
 Ben Woollaston 5–2 Andrew Pagett
 Ahmed Galal 5–4 Kritsanut Lertsattayathorn

Group E

 Babar Masih 1–5 James Wattana
 Stuart Bingham 5–1 Babar Masih
 Ryan Day 5–1 Darren Morgan
 Wayne Brown 2–5 James Wattana
 Stuart Bingham 5–2 Darren Morgan
 Wayne Brown 4–5 Babar Masih
 Ryan Day 5–4 James Wattana
 Stuart Bingham 5–1 James Wattana
 Ryan Day 5–1 Wayne Brown
 Darren Morgan 5–4 Babar Masih
 Stuart Bingham 5–0 Ryan Day
 Wayne Brown 5–4 Darren Morgan
 Stuart Bingham 5–2 Wayne Brown
 Ryan Day 5–3 Babar Masih
 Wayne Brown 3–5 James Wattana

Group F

 Joe Perry 5–4 Hesham Abdelhmed
 Michael White 5–3 Sourav Kothari
 Ivan Kakovsky 3–5 Noppon Saengkham
 Joe Perry 5–1 Ivan Kakovsky
 Sourav Kothari 0–5 Noppon Saengkham
 Joe Perry 5–4 Michael White
 Ivan Kakovsky 5–4 Sourav Kothari
 Hesham Abdelhmed 3–5 Noppon Saengkham
 Joe Perry 5–1 Noppon Saengkham
 Michael White 5–0 Ivan Kakovsky
 Sourav Kothari 5–0 Hesham Abdelhmed
 Michael White 5–0 Hesham Abdelhmed
 Ivan Kakovsky 5–4 Hesham Abdelhmed
 Joe Perry 5–1 Sourav Kothari
 Michael White 3–5 Noppon Saengkham

Group G

 Mateusz Baranowski 5–1 Daniell Haenga
 Mark Williams 3–5 Yuan Sijun
 Stephen Maguire 5–3 Daniell Haenga
 Mateusz Baranowski 1–5 Suchakree Poomjaeng 
 Mark Williams 5–3 Daniell Haenga
 Mateusz Baranowski 4–5 Yuan Sijun
 Stephen Maguire 4–5 Suchakree Poomjaeng
 Mark Williams 5–1 Mateusz Baranowski
 Stephen Maguire 5–2 Yuan Sijun
 Daniell Haenga 0–5 Suchakree Poomjaeng
 Mark Williams 3–5 Stephen Maguire
 Yuan Sijun 5–3 Suchakree Poomjaeng
 Mark Williams 5–3 Suchakree Poomjaeng
 Stephen Maguire 5–0 Daniell Haenga
 Daniell Haenga 2–5 Yuan Sijun

Group H

 Mark Selby 5–3 Keen Hoo Moh
 Matthew Selt 5–2 Peter McCullagh
 Luca Brecel 5–3 Boonyarit Keattikun
 Mark Selby 4–5 Luca Brecel
 Matthew Selt 5–0 Keen Hoo Moh
 Peter McCullagh 4–5 Boonyarit Keattikun
 Matthew Selt 5–3 Boonyarit Keattikun
 Luca Brecel 5–0 Keen Hoo Moh
 Mark Selby 5–1 Peter McCullagh
 Mark Selby 5–2 Boonyarit Keattikun
 Matthew Selt 3–5 Luca Brecel
 Peter McCullagh 5–0 Keen Hoo Moh
 Mark Selby 5–3 Matthew Selt
 Luca Brecel w/d–w/o Peter McCullagh
 Keen Hoo Moh 1–5 Boonyarit Keattikun

Knockout stage

Final

Maximum breaks 
(Note: A maximum break in six-red snooker is 75.)
 Matthew Selt
 Liang Wenbo
 Pankaj Advani

References

External links
 

2016
2016 in Thai sport
2016 in snooker
September 2016 sports events in Thailand